Thiobutabarbital (Inactin, Brevinarcon) is a short-acting barbiturate derivative invented in the 1950s. It has sedative, anticonvulsant and hypnotic effects, and is still used in veterinary medicine for induction in surgical anaesthesia.

Stereochemistry 
Thiobutabarbital contains a stereocenter and consists of two enantiomers. This is a racemate, ie a 1: 1 mixture of ( R ) - and the ( S ) - form:

References 

Thiobarbiturates
GABAA receptor positive allosteric modulators